ICAC may refer to:
Independent Commission Against Corruption (Hong Kong)
Independent Commission Against Corruption (Mauritius)
Independent Commission Against Corruption (New South Wales) 
Independent Commissioner Against Corruption (Northern Territory) 
Independent Commission Against Corruption (South Australia)  
Indiana Collegiate Athletic Conference
Institute of Chartered Accountants of the Caribbean
Intermountain Collegiate Athletic Conference
The International Cotton Advisory Committee
Internet Crimes Against Children

See also
Independent Broad-based Anti-corruption Commission (IBAC) (Victoria)
Crime and Corruption Commission (Queensland)
International Certification Accreditation Council (ICAC)
LCAC (disambiguation)